The Palanga Circuit is a temporary race track, located in Lithuanian resort town of Palanga. An annual 1000 km race has been held on this circuit since 2000.

Track information

The track is  street circuit. The race track lies on the intersection of the A11 and A13 highways.

Lap records

The unofficial track record belongs to Ralf Aron, who set fastest time of 1:06.148 in his Audi R8 LMS GT3 in the qualifying of the 2022 1000 km race. The official fastest lap records at the Palanga circuit are listed as:

External links
Official website

References

Motorsport venues in Lithuania